Public housing in Puerto Rico is a subsidized system of housing units, mostly consisting of housing projects (or ), which are provided for low-income families in Puerto Rico. The system is mainly financed with programs from the US Department of Housing and Urban Development (HUD) and the US Department of Agriculture USDA Rural Development. As of 2020, there were 325 public housing developments in Puerto Rico.

Introduction

An  is a type of housing where land is developed into lots, often by a private developer, and where single-family homes are built. Non single-family units, such as condominiums and townhouses fall into this category.

Public housing, on the other hand, are housing units built with government funding. This is housing where all exterior grounds are shared areas. Increasingly, public housing developments that look like garden apartments are being built.

Finally, a home that is located in neither an  nor of a public housing development is said to be located in a barrio.

In Puerto Rico, a barrio also has a second and official meaning- the geographical area into which a municipality of Puerto Rico is divided for administrative purposes. In this sense, urbanizaciones, public housing developments, as well as one or several "barrios" in the popular sense of the word, may be located in one of the 902 official geographic areas which are seen on the Puerto Rico US Census records.

History

By the early 1940s  was addressing the issue of subpar housing in Puerto Rico. A law passed in Puerto Rico in 1945 allowed housing agencies to clear slum areas. One of the provisions of the US Housing Act of 1949 did the same.

Law 93-383 passed by the US Congress on August 22, 1974 for the improvement of residences, included Puerto Rico.

Puerto Rico Housing and CRUV were responsible for the design and construction of many of the older "residenciales" in Puerto Rico. 

The first three public housing developments, Ponce De Leon, Santiago Iglesias and Caribe, are located in the city of Ponce. Henry Klumb provided early support for those efforts and one of his protégés, George McClintock was the first Architect-in-Chief of Puerto Rico Housing in the early-to-mid 1950s. 

Klumb's designs are the 1945 design work for the Cataño, San Lorenzo, Lares and Aguadilla Puerto Rico Housing projects, Naranjito Public Housing Project in 1957, Comerío Public Housing Project in 1958, and Residencial Las Virtudes, designed and built between 1969 ad 1976. Klumb had previously done work for several municipal housing agencies, including Mayagüez' and Ponce's.

In 1973, José Enrique Arrarás became the first Secretary of Housing. He was appointed by Gov. Rafael Hernández Colón.

In 1993, then governor Pedro Rosselló had the Puerto Rico National Guard doing security work at some of the public housing areas where crime, related to drug trafficking, was most prevalent.

Since their construction, there have been many occasions when families are evicted en masse, and the buildings are demolished to make space for the erection of some new type of housing, that doesn't resemble "public housing".

Organization

As of 2020, there were 325 public housing developments in Puerto Rico under the Puerto Rico Public Housing Authority (PRPHA) and being managed by Management Agents. Operating funds are provided by HUD for tenant rent subsidizing and for the construction, acquisition, maintenance, and operations of public housing projects, which are in turn administered by several entities throughout the island called Public Housing Agencies (PHAs).

The main Public Housing Agency in Puerto Rico is the Public Housing Administration (Administración de Vivienda Pública, or AVP, in Spanish) under the Puerto Rico Department of Housing (Departamento de Vivienda in Spanish). Other Public Housing Agencies include certain municipalities which are authorized by HUD and commonwealth law to operate housing projects independent of the main state PHA. All PHAs can contract a Management Agent (usually a for-profit enterprise) to manage the day-to-day operations, including processing tenant complaints, housing unit repairs, and overall project maintenance.

HUD also allows private non-profit organizations and for-profit enterprises to manage housing projects as PHAs, offering program funding and tax incentives (Tax Credit Projects) in order to compensate for operating costs. However, these types of public housing projects are not as common in Puerto Rico as those that are managed by the state.

The PHA is responsible for providing adequate living arrangements for program tenants, in compliance with Uniform Physical Condition Standards (UPCS) (formerly Housing Quality Standards (HQS)) set by HUD. Additionally, the PHA must manage all federal funds received in an efficient and reasonable way, in compliance with HUD prescribed guidelines and with Chapter 24 of the US Code of Federal Regulations (CFR). Management Agents are also required to comply with these standards. The USDA provides federal loan programs (including direct loans or loan guarantees) to PHAs for the construction of new public housing projects or acquisition of existing living complexes to convert into public projects.

For example, an address at Residencial Luis Llorens Torres, with more than 2000 units, would have an address such as "23 Res Llorens Torres, San Juan, Puerto Rico, 00924-1234" for apartment number 23.

Eligible tenants
The tenant rent subsidizing system allows low-income and impoverished individuals and families to reside in a subsidized housing unit just as long as their income status complies with federal regulations. Families wanting to participate must first be included on a waiting list, which includes all citizens applying for subsidized housing by order of application date. Families must therefore "wait their turn" for eligibility as the PHA selects families by that order, a process which in Puerto Rico may take several years. Applicants must provide evidence of low-income status (HUD recommends a copy of a filed income tax return) and are given a housing unit for which HUD will subsidize its rent.

Criticism 
Supporters of the system argue that the average annual income per person in Puerto Rico of $12,000 (2004), a figure which is much lower than in the United States, explains why a relatively larger portion of the island population participates in the system.

Criticism of public housing in Puerto Rico includes that these types of dwellings are, by nature, a breeding ground for crime.

In a small 2014 study of the female incarcerated population of Puerto Rico, they lived in either a "barrio",  or public housing before their incarceration.

List of public housing in PR 
The following is a list Puerto Rico Public Housing Authority (PRPHA) low-rent units, managed by municipalities, and by private, non-profit and for-profit agents, with some providing a computer room with internet access and library to its residents. As of March 28, 2020, there were 325 projects (with 53828 units) and 4 protects being constructed (with 174 units) for a total of 54002 units.

These, approximately, 54000 units are managed by Management Agents - A & M Contract, Inc., American Management, Cost Control Company, Inc., Individual Management and Consultant, Inc., Inn-Capital Housing Division, J. A. Machuca & Assoc., M. J. Consulting & Dev., Inc., Martinal Property Corp., MAS Corporation, Mora Housing Management, Inc., and S. P. Management, Corp., as follows:

Public Housing Authorities
Public Housing Authorities are government agencies designated by the US Department of Housing and Urban Development to administer federally subsidized housing units, which are known as Section 8 housing.
Source: Public Housing Agency (HA) Profiles, US Department of Housing and Urban Development

Gallery

See also

Public housing
Section 8 (housing)

References

Further reading
Klumb: An Architecture of Social Concern, 2006, UPR Press,

External links
US Department of Housing and Urban Development (HUD) official website
US Department of Agriculture (USDA) official website
Catalog of Federal Domestic Assistance (CFDA), official website which provides information on all US domestic federal programs, including those of HUD and the USDA
OMB Circular A-133 of the United States Office of Management and Budget, which provides details and insight on HUD program operations and compliance requirements.
 200 Press Releases for "Puerto Rico + public housing" on DEA website

 
Welfare in Puerto Rico